I Love You, I Love You Not is a 1996 American romantic drama film directed by Billy Hopkins and written (also the play) by Wendy Kesselman.

Plot
The film is told through the stories of two women: Nana, a grandmother, and Daisy, her granddaughter.

Daisy tells Nana of her strong and blossoming romance with a young man named Ethan and her problems at school because she is Jewish. Nana tells the story of her young life when she was sent to a ghetto and then a concentration camp.

The romantic love feelings she has for the boy are indeed strong and genuine, but the romantic love he has for her is questionable.

Ethan lets his friends judge her from the outside, not for who she is on the inside. And when she turns out to not be like every other girl he breaks up with her.

Daisy is sad so she goes and sees Nana and takes her anger out on her. She then runs away and tries to kill herself by walking in front of a moving train but she does not as her nana is there for her.

At the end, she tries to see him again but he looks at her for a long time and walks away with his friends. She stands there; heartbroken, sad and crying, realizing that maybe it was not meant to be and she walks away happy.

Cast
Jeanne Moreau as Nana
Claire Danes as Daisy/Young Nana
Jude Law as Ethan
James Van Der Beek as Tony
Kris Park as Seth
Lauren Fox as Alsion
Emily Burkes-Nossiter as Jessica
Carrie Szlasa as Jane
Julia Stiles as Young Nana's Friend
Robert Sean Leonard as Angel of Death
Frederick Neumann as School Principal
Peter F. Hopkins as Mr. Douglas
Jerry Tanklow as Mr. Gilman

Reception

External links

 

1996 films
American romantic drama films
English-language French films
English-language German films
Films about Jews and Judaism
French romantic drama films
German romantic drama films
British romantic drama films
Films about families
Films about the aftermath of the Holocaust
1990s teen drama films
Films set in Manhattan
American films based on plays
Films shot in New York (state)
Films shot in Germany
1996 romantic drama films
1990s English-language films
1990s American films
1990s British films
1990s French films
1990s German films